The Temein languages, or Nuba Hills languages, are a group of Eastern Sudanic languages spoken in the Nuba Mountains of Sudan.

Languages
The Temein languages are not closely related. 
Temein (Ronge; 10,000 speakers)
Doni (Keiga Jirru)
Tese (Dese)

Temein is the most conservative language; Doni and Tese have been strongly influenced by Kadu languages.

Demographics
Demographic information of the three Temein languages according to Blench (2013):

See also
Temein word lists (Wiktionary)

References

Blench, Roger. 2006. Comparative Temein wordlists.

External links
Temein languages (Roger Blench)

 
Southern Eastern Sudanic languages
Languages of Sudan
Language families